Baron Nikola Jurišić (– 1545) was a Croatian nobleman, soldier, and diplomat.

Early life
Jurišić was born in Senj, Croatia.

He is first mentioned in 1522 as an officer of Ferdinand I of Habsburg's troops deployed in Croatian forts in defense against the invasion of the Ottoman Empire under Suleiman I, advancing towards Vienna. Between 1522 and 1526, he obtained knighthood.

After the Battle of Mohács in 1526, the king made him the supreme army commander of the armed forces defending the borders (supremus capitaneus, Veldhauptmann unseres Kriegsfolks wider Turken). Jurišić in turn helped Ferdinand of Habsburg become the king of Croatia by brokering the 1527 election in Cetin. In 1530, Jurišić was sent to Constantinople to negotiate with the Ottomans for peace.

Siege of Güns (Kőszeg) in 1532

In 1532, Captain Nikola Jurišić defended the small border fort of Kőszeg (Kingdom of Hungary) with only 700–800 Croatian soldiers with no cannons and few guns, preventing the advance of the Turkish army of 120,000–140,000 toward Vienna.

There are two versions of that battle.
In one version, after Suleiman I led an army of 140,000 towards Vienna, Nikola Jurišić and his 800 soldiers responded to the calls of the Habsburg Emperor to defend the city.  While passing through western Hungary they saw helpless women and children in the small fort of Koszeg, and decided to defend it. The fort was on the route to Vienna, so Suleiman II attacked it, and after three days of fighting Jurišić wrote:  "...I and 89 of my knights are tired and low on supplies. If we hold another day it will be a miracle..." Before the final charge women and children prayed to Saint Martin for two hours, and the final battle started. After ten minutes of battle the Turks retreated, and reported they saw a flaming knight with flaming sword.
 In the second version, the city was offered terms for a nominal surrender. The only Ottomans who would be allowed to enter the castle would be a token force who would raise the Turkish flag. Suleiman withdrew at the arrival of the August rains and did not continue towards Vienna as previously planned, but homeward. He had been delayed nearly four weeks, and during this time a powerful army had been collected in Vienna, which the sultan did not intend to face. By their heroism, Nikola Jurišić and his men had saved Vienna from a siege.

Later life

Following the 1537 Battle of Gorjani, he was again made the supremus capitaneus of Slavonia and Lower Austria. In 1540, he was the capitaneus of Carniola.

He spent the last years of his life as a secret adviser at the court in Vienna.
Jurišić died in Kőszeg, Hungary.

See also
Jurišić
Little War in Hungary
Ottoman wars in Europe

References

External links
 Pallas Nagy Lexikona (Hungarian)

Military commanders of Croatian kingdoms
15th-century Croatian nobility
16th-century Croatian nobility
Austrian nobility
People from Senj
16th-century Croatian military personnel
1490 births
1545 deaths
Croatian Roman Catholics
Barons of Croatia
Croatian military personnel in Austrian armies
Hungarian nobility
Hungarian soldiers
Hungarian people of Croatian descent
Habsburg Croats
15th-century Croatian people
16th-century Croatian people